Dorothy Gwendolen Cawood  (9 December 1884 – 16 February 1962) was an Australian civilian and military nurse.  She was one of the first three members of the Australian Army Nursing Service (AANS) to be awarded the Military Medal in World War I.

Early life and training

Cawood was born at Parramatta to John and Sarah Travis (née Garnet) Cawood. Her father was a carpenter and long-time member of the Parramatta Volunteer Rifles. After school, Cawood trained as a nurse at the Coast Hospital, Little Bay and worked there until her enlistment.

First World War

Cawood volunteered as a staff nurse for the Australian Army Nursing Service (AANS) on 14 November 1914.  Two weeks later she left Sydney on the hospital ship HMAT A.55 Kyarra as a member of the No. 2 Australian General Hospital, bound for Egypt. She was promoted to nursing sister in 1915 while serving on a hospital ship and transports. 

On 28 September 1917, Cawood was awarded the Military Medal "for bravery in the Field". She was one of only seven nurses in the AANS to receive that honour in the First World War. 

Cawood was further honoured in Sir John Haig's despatch of 7 November 1917 "for distinguished and gallant service between the period Feby 26 M/N to September 26 M/N 1917". She remained on service in Italy after the declaration of peace until early 1919, when she was transferred to England. Cawood left Devonport, England for Australia in May 1919 on Sudan arriving on 3 July. She was officially discharged on 1 September 1919.

Post-war career

On her return to Sydney Cawood took a position nursing at the Liverpool State Hospital and Asylum. In November 1922 she was appointed sub-matron (on six months’ probation) of the same hospital, with her appointment confirmed in June 1923. She was promoted matron of the David Berry Hospital, Berry in September 1925, where she worked until her retirement in 1943.

Death
Cawood died in Parramatta on 16 February 1962 and was buried at Rookwood cemetery. She never married.

References

1884 births
1962 deaths
Australian military nurses
Australian recipients of the Military Medal
Australian women of World War I